Bashir Mohamed Jama "Goobe" is a politician and former Somali Armed Forces officer. He is currently the Director-General of the Somali Agency for Construction and Development.  He served twice as the Chief of the Somali Custodial Corps and also served as the Director of the National Intelligence and Security Agency from 2013 to 2014. He received the highest rank of Lieutenant General and served as the only Lieutenant General since the former Prime Minister Mohamed Ali Samatar retired in 1991.

Career
Jama hails from one of the country's ethnic minority groups (Reer Kuulbeer).

He served in Somali Police since 1975 until 1991, and from 2000 until 2013. Before that, he was the Director of the Somali Ministry of Interior before serving as  Deputy Minister of Somali Social Development.

Beginning in August 2012, he began serving as an MP in the House of the People or Lower House of the Federal Parliament of Somalia.

In May 2013, Jama was appointed the new Director of the National Intelligence and Security Agency (NISA) in place of Abdikarin Dahir.

On 9 July 2014, following a security reform, Jama was replaced as intelligence chief with Abdullahi Mohamed Ali.

In September 2021, Prime Minister Mohamed Hussein Roble re-appointed Jama as Director General of NISA.

References

Living people
Somalian politicians
Year of birth missing (living people)